The Commission de toponymie du Québec (English: Toponymy Commission of Québec) is the Government of Québec's public body responsible for cataloging, preserving, making official and publicize Québec's place names and their origins according to the province's toponymy rules. 
It also provides recommendations to the government with regard to toponymic changes.

Its mandate covers the namings of:
 natural geographical features (lakes, rivers, mountains, etc.)
 constructed features (dams, embankments, bridges, etc.)
 administrative units (wildlife sanctuaries, administrative regions, parks, etc.)
 inhabited areas (villages, towns, Indian reserves, etc.)
 roadways (streets, roads, boulevards, etc.)

A child agency of the Office québécois de la langue française, it was created in 1977 through jurisdiction defined in the Charter of the French Language to replace the Commission of Geography, created in 1912.

See also

 Toponymy
 Toponym'elles
 Office québécois de la langue française

References

External links
 Commission de toponymie of Québec
 Office québécois de la langue française

Names of places in Canada
Quebec government departments and agencies
Organizations based in Montreal
Geographical naming agencies